Real Sociedad Deportiva Santa Isabel is a Spanish football team based in Zaragoza, in the autonomous community of Aragón. Founded in 1970, it plays in Regional Preferente de Aragón, holding home games at César Lainez, with a 1,000-seat capacity.

Season to season

4 seasons in Tercera División

External links
Official website 
futbolaragon.com profile

Football clubs in Aragon
Sport in Zaragoza
Association football clubs established in 1970
Divisiones Regionales de Fútbol clubs
1970 establishments in Spain